This article shows all records, players and match records, from the St. George Illawarra Dragons Rugby League Football Club.

Team

Biggest wins

Biggest losses

Most consecutive wins
 9 – (27 March 2011 – 29 May 2011)
 8 – (17 July 2005 – 10 September 2005)
 7 – (17 May 2008 – 5 July 2008)

Most consecutive losses
 8 - (16 July 2021 – 4 September 2021)
 7 - (8 June 2015 – 2 August 2015)

Biggest comeback
 Trailed Manly 34–10 after 57 minutes to win 36–34 at WIN Jubilee Stadium (19 August 2004).

Worst collapse
 Led Melbourne 14–0 at halftime to lose 20–18 at Stadium Australia (1999 Grand Final)
 Led Sydney 14–0 after 53 minutes to lose 18–14 at Aussie Stadium (16 July 2004)
 Led Canterbury 14–0 after 36 minutes to lose 28–24 at WIN Stadium (28 July 2007)

 Led South Sydney 20–0 after 15 Minutes, then 24–22 with 4 Minutes remaining to lose 34–24 (31 July 2011)

Individual
(Updated as of Round 15, 2022)

Most Games for Club
273, Ben Hornby (2000–2012)
270, Ben Creagh (2003–2016)
266, Jason Nightingale (2007–2018)
243, Matt Cooper (2000–2013)
209, Dean Young (2003–2012)
189, Jack de Belin (2011–2018, 2021–)
174, Mark Gasnier (2000–2008, 2010–2011)
169, Brett Morris (2006–2014)
165, Tyson Frizell (2013–2020)
156, Jason Ryles (2000–2008)

Most Points For Club
977 (39 tries, 398 goals, 25 field goals), Jamie Soward (2007–2013)
912 (33 tries, 387 goals, 6 field goals), Gareth Widdop (2014–2019)
517 (30 tries, 198 goals, 1 field goal), Mark Riddell (2001–2004)
503 (28 tries, 195 goals, 1 field goal), Zac Lomax (2018–)
496 (124 tries), Matt Cooper (2000–2013)
448 (112 tries), Brett Morris (2006–2014)
440 (110 tries), Jason Nightingale (2007–2018)

In a season
228 – Jamie Soward in 24 games, 2009
205 – Gareth Widdop in 22 games, 2018
197 – Jamie Soward in 24 games, 2010
191 – Gareth Widdop in 21 games, 2017
182 – Gareth Widdop in 21 games, 2015
178 – Zac Lomax in 20 games, 2020
167 – Zac Lomax in 24 games, 2022
166 – Mark Riddell in 24 games, 2003
162 – Wayne Bartrim in 25 games, 1999
157 – Jamie Soward in 23 games, 2011
137 – Gareth Widdop in 24 games, 2014

In a game
22 – Zac Lomax (2 tries, 7 goals)
22 – Gareth Widdop (1 try, 9 goals)
22 – Gareth Widdop (1 try, 9 goals)
22 – Amos Roberts (1 try, 9 goals)
22 – Jamie Soward (1 try, 9 goals)
21 – Jamie Soward (2 tries, 6 goals, 1 field goal)
20 – Jamie Soward (1 try, 8 goals)
20 – Aaron Gorrell (1 try, 8 goals)
20 – Gareth Widdop (1 try, 8 goals)

Most Tries for Club
124, Matt Cooper (2000–2013)
112, Brett Morris (2006–2014)
110, Jason Nightingale (2007–2018)
100, Nathan Blacklock (1999–2004)
92, Mark Gasnier (2000–2008, 2010–2011)
59, Ben Hornby (2000–2012)
54, Ben Creagh (2003–2016)
47, Trent Barrett (1999–2006)
44, Matthew Dufty (2017–2021)
43, Mikaele Ravalawa (2019–)

In a season
27 – Nathan Blacklock in 28 games, 2001
25 – Brett Morris in 24 games, 2009
25 – Nathan Blacklock in 26 games, 2000
24 – Nathan Blacklock in 26 games, 1999
20 – Colin Best in 26 games, 2005
20 – Brett Morris in 23 games, 2010
18 – Lee Hookey in 25 games, 2002
17 – Matt Cooper in 23 games, 2004
17 – Anthony Mundine in 23 games, 1999

In a game

 4 – Matt Cooper (2004)
 4 – Mark Gasnier (2004)
 4 – Brett Morris (2004)

See also

List of NRL records

References

Records
Sydney-sport-related lists
National Rugby League lists
Australian records
Rugby league records and statistics